Sylvia Hanika defeated the defending champion Martina Navratilova in the final, 1–6, 6–3, 6–4 to win the singles tennis title at the 1982 Avon Championships.

Draw

Finals

Round robin

Red group

Q: qualifies to semifinals. PO: advances to play-off round. Allen takes 2nd place after defeating Mandlíková

White group

Q: qualifies to semifinals. PO: advances to play-off round.

References

External links
 ITF tournament edition details

1982 WTA Tour
Singles